Anarta fulgora is a species of cutworm or dart moth in the family Noctuidae first described by William Barnes and James Halliday McDunnough in 1918. It is found in North America.

The MONA or Hodges number for Anarta fulgora is 10225.

References

Further reading

 
 
 

Anarta (moth)
Articles created by Qbugbot
Moths described in 1918